Space Talk may refer to:

 A radio program about the aerospace industry hosted by Jim Banke
 A song by Asha Puthli